Socialist Youth League of Norway (in Norwegian: Norges sosialistiske ungdomsforbund), initially founded as the Social Democratic Youth League of Norway (Norges sosialdemokratiske ungdomsforbund), was the youth wing of the Social Democratic Labour Party of Norway (NSA). NSU was formed on January 8, 1922.

In May 1926, the organization took its later name.

The organ of NSU was Arbeiderungdommen.

At a unity congress held in 1927 NSU merged with the Left Communist Youth League (VKU) to form the Workers' Youth League (AUF), as the youth wing of the unified Norwegian Labour Party (DNA).

1922 establishments in Norway
1927 disestablishments in Norway
Youth wings of political parties in Norway
Socialism in Norway

no:Norges sosialistiske ungdomsforbund